Nicolae Lupescu (17 December 1940 – 6 September 2017) was a Romanian football defender and manager.

Club career

Nicolae Lupescu was born on 17 December 1940 in Bucharest, Romania. He started to play football at junior level in 1954 at ICAR București, afterwards playing for Flacăra Roșie București, starting his senior career by playing two seasons in Divizia B, the first one at Academia Militară București and the second at Olimpia București. He was eventually brought to Rapid București by coach Nicolae Roșculeț where he debuted in Divizia A on 16 September 1962 in a 4–2 victory against Farul Constanța. He remained with Rapid for ten seasons, winning the title in the 1966–67 season, being used by coach Valentin Stănescu in 26 matches in which he scored one goal. Lupescu also won the 1971–72 Cupa României, two Balkans Cup and played all the six games in the 1971–72 UEFA Cup campaign, as the team reached the eight-finals, eliminating Napoli and Legia Warsaw, being eliminated by the team who would eventually win the competition, Tottenham. During Romania's communist era, transfers of Romanian footballers outside the country were rarely allowed, but Lupescu convinced Ștefan Andrei who was the Secretary for Foreign Relations of the Central Committee to help him gain the regime's approval of his transfer at Admira Wacker in 1972 for which Rapid received 40.000$. He made his Austrian Bundesliga debut on 15 September 1972 under coach Ernst Ocwirk in a 0–0 against Austria Klagenfurt, the team finishing the season on the 4th place, which would be the best performance of the team in the championship during his 5 seasons spent there, also helping Admira eliminate Inter Milan in the 1973–74 UEFA Cup. Nicolae Lupescu has a total of 244 matches and 8 goals scored in Divizia A, 134 games and 9 goals scored in the Austrian Bundesliga and 16 appearances without scoring in European competitions.

International career
Nicolae Lupescu earned 20 caps and scored two goals for Romania, all under the guidance of coach Angelo Niculescu, making his debut on 25 June 1967 in a 1–0 home loss against Italy at the Euro 1968 qualifiers. Angelo Niculescu also used him in all the minutes of the three group matches from the 1970 World Cup final tournament as Romania did not advance to the next stage. He played 8 matches and scored two goals at the 1972 Euro qualifiers, managing to reach the quarter-finals where Romania was defeated by Hungary, who advanced to the final tournament. Lupescu was also Romania's captain in a friendly against Netherlands which ended with a 2–0 loss and made his last appearance for the national team on 17 June 1972 in a friendly against Italy which ended 3–3.

For representing his country at the 1970 World Cup, Lupescu was decorated by President of Romania Traian Băsescu on 25 March 2008 with the Ordinul "Meritul Sportiv" – (The Medal "The Sportive Merit") class III.

International goals
Scores and results list Romania's goal tally first, score column indicates score after each Lupescu goal.

Personal life
He was the father of professional football player Ioan Lupescu. On 6 September 2017, Nicolae Lupescu died at the Fundeni hospital from Bucharest at age 76.

Honours

Player
Rapid București
Divizia A: 1966–67
Cupa României: 1971–72
Balkans Cup: 1963–64, 1964–66

Manager
Gloria Buzău
Divizia B: 1983–84

Notes

References

External links

1940 births
2017 deaths
Footballers from Bucharest
Romanian footballers
Association football defenders
Romania international footballers
Olympic footballers of Romania
Liga I players
Austrian Football Bundesliga players
Olympia București players
FC Rapid București players
FC Admira Wacker Mödling players
1970 FIFA World Cup players
Romanian football managers
FC Rapid București managers
FC Gloria Buzău managers
FC Progresul București managers
Romanian expatriate footballers
Romanian expatriate sportspeople in Austria
Expatriate footballers in Austria